genre b.goode is the record label used by Australian band TISM. Formed around 1995, the unusual title comes from one of the founding members of TISM who chose his stage name as Genre B. Goode. According to the remaining members of TISM, Genre's "complete non-sell-out stance" was "simultaneously stupid and inspiring to the rest of the band" which is why they named their record label after him. The label, however, is not a label in and of itself. It tends to be used as a vanity label the band attach to their recordings regardless of who they're signed to at the time.

In 2020, the label was resurrected after lying dormant for 16 years as part of the ongoing vinyl reissue campaign of the group's work.

See also

TISM
List of record labels

References

External links

Australian record labels
TISM
Record labels established in 1995
Vanity record labels
Alternative rock record labels
Record labels based in Melbourne